The Fred Hall House is a historic house at 2nd and West Searcy Streets in Kensett, Arkansas.  It is a -story wood-frame structure, finished in stone and composition shingles.  It has a cross-gable roof configuration, with a gabled porch projecting from the left front.  It is supported by sloping square wooden columns, and has exposed rafters.  Built in 1930, it is a good local example of Craftsman architecture.

The house was listed on the National Register of Historic Places in 1991.

See also
National Register of Historic Places listings in White County, Arkansas

References

Houses on the National Register of Historic Places in Arkansas
Houses completed in 1930
Houses in White County, Arkansas
National Register of Historic Places in White County, Arkansas